The Battle of Cambrai, 1918 (also known as the Second Battle of Cambrai) was a battle between troops of the British First, Third and Fourth Armies and German Empire forces during the Hundred Days Offensive of the First World War. The battle took place in and around the French city of Cambrai, between 8 and 10 October 1918. The battle incorporated many of the newer tactics of 1918, in particular tanks. The battle witnessed over 300 tanks taking part, gaining considerable ground in less than 36 hours, with about 2,000 more British casualties than German, which was light relative to earlier phases of the war.

Battle
The weak defence was due to the Allied general offensive across the Western Front, and specifically in this sector, the rapid approach of the Canadian Corps, who had overwhelmed much stronger defences in the previous days. The German defenders were unprepared for the bombardment by 324 tanks, closely supported by infantry and aircraft.

On 8 October, the 2nd Canadian Division entered Cambrai and encountered sporadic and light resistance. However, they rapidly pressed northward, leaving the "mopping up" of the town to the 3rd Canadian Division following close behind. When the 3rd entered the town on 10 October, they found it deserted. Fewer than 20 casualties had been taken.

Aftermath
Although the capture of Cambrai was achieved significantly faster than expected, German resistance northeast of the town stiffened, slowing the advance and forcing the Canadian Corps to dig in.

The British soldier Arthur Bullock recounts entering Cambrai after it had been taken and the Front had moved to a ridge beyond. He describes the continued repulsion of the German forces, with "masses of troops being deployed and withdrawn to a strict timetable", and recorded that "what made the heart beat faster was the sound of music – the battalions were marching in with bands playing". He recalled that over half a million men could be seen from one position: "It was a spectacle on a grand scale, of irresistible military might operated on a clockwork basis with an assurance and buoyancy of spirit which baffles description". Bullock also recalls marching through "The empty echoing streets of Cambrai, with the band playing".

Legacy 
The Battle of Cambrai was featured in the game Battlefield 1 as the setting of the mission “Through Mud and Blood”.

Footnotes

References
 
 
  (Pages 77–79)

External links

 The Battles of the Hindenburg Line

Cambrai (1918)
Cambrai (1918)
Battles of World War I involving Canada
Battles of World War I involving New Zealand
Battles of World War I involving Germany
Battles of World War I involving the United Kingdom
Battles of the Western Front (World War I)
Battle honours of the King's Royal Rifle Corps
Battle of Cambrai (1918)
October 1918 events